Phi Alpha Theta is an American honor society for undergraduate and graduate students and professors of history.
It has more than 400,000 members, with new members numbering about 9,000 a year through its 970 chapters.

Founding 
Phi Alpha Theta was established on March 17, 1921, at the University of Arkansas by Professor Nels Cleven. Cleven had become convinced in his time at the university that a fraternity of scholars (which would accept men or women) was important for the study of history. He invited students to a meeting to form the society (then called the "University Historical Society") on March 14, and the society was officially recognized on the 17th. In April, the decision was made for the society to be known by the Greek letters Phi Alpha Theta. These letters may refer to the words "philia," "anthropos," and "theos."

Symbolism 
The Society's colors are "madonna red" and "madonna blue".

The description of the Society's emblem is precise: The emblem of the Society is a gold disc, "with the edge milled to represent a serpent's body, the forepart of the serpent's body being on the right side of the badge, and the eye shall be represented by a red jewel." On the face is a raised six-pointed star faced with black, "and bearing in gold the Greek letters Phi Alpha Theta horizontally across the middle, and the points bearing the Greek letters psi, pi, alpha, lambda, upsilon, and psi [, and  again] in clockwise rotation beginning at the uppermost point." The emblem can be jeweled.

This emblem may be mounted upon a gold key, "which shall be in the form of a rectangle nineteen by twenty-one millimeters, and the corners of which shall be cut along the arcs of circles having a radius of four millimeters, the centers of said circles being at the corners of the key, and the edges of the key shall be [beveled] to a distance not to exceed one millimeter from the edge." A cylindrical stem projects from the top of the emblem, finished with a ring. The cylinder projects from the lower edge of the key, similarly.

The Society's official flower is the red rose.

Publications and leadership 
Phi Alpha Theta publishes a quarterly historical journal entitled The Historian, which has over 12,500 individual subscribers and 1,000 library subscribers. The Historian splits the space in its quarterly issues between articles and book reviews.  The book review section of the journal has been based at Ohio Wesleyan University since 1994.

The society's national headquarters and the journal's editorial offices are located at the University of South Florida.

Voces Novae: Chapman University Historical Review was founded in the Spring of 2009 by the Alpha Mu Gamma chapter of Phi Alpha Theta at Chapman University.

Debra A. Mulligan of Roger Williams University is the current president, and Hosok O of Utah Tech University is the vice president of Phi Alpha Theta National History Honor Society. Clayton J. Drees is chair of the Advisory Board. Adrian O’Connor of the University of South Florida is the managing editor of The Historian, and Jonathan Scott Perry also of USF is the journal's book review editor.

Membership requirements 
Undergraduate students must have a 3.0 overall grade point average, at least a 3.1 average in their history courses and have completed 12 credits of history classes.  Undergraduate candidates must also be in the top 35% of their class. Students enrolled at an online university are not eligible for membership. Students need not be majoring in history, but must have taken at least four history courses at the university level.  Specific universities may develop higher qualifications. For example, the College of Staten Island's PAT chapter requires undergraduate students to have a GPA of or better than 3.25, History GPA of or better than 3.5 and at least 16 hours completed in History classes. Graduate students must have a GPA of better than 3.5 and have completed approximately 30% of the residence requirements for the master's degree.

References

External links

 The society's official web site
 The Historian homepage hosted by Blackwell Publishing
 The Historian's Book Review Section website

Honor societies
Student societies in the United States
Student organizations established in 1921
University of Arkansas
Association of College Honor Societies
1921 establishments in Arkansas